Salim Nedjel Hammou (born 5 June 1972 in Oran) is an Algerian handball player. He competed in the men's tournament at the 1996 Summer Olympics.

References

Living people
MC Oran Handball players
Algerian male handball players
Olympic handball players of Algeria
Handball players at the 1996 Summer Olympics
Sportspeople from Oran
Algerian expatriates in France
1972 births
21st-century Algerian people